The 1999 Buffalo Bulls football team represented the University at Buffalo in the 1999 NCAA Division I-A football season. The Bulls offense scored 130 points while the defense allowed 426 points.

Schedule

References

Buffalo
Buffalo Bulls football seasons
College football winless seasons
Buffalo Bulls football